West Virginia Route 49 is a north–south state highway located within Mingo County, West Virginia. The southern terminus is at the Kentucky state line, where WV 49 becomes the short Kentucky Route 194 Spur upon crossing the Tug Fork of the Big Sandy River. The northern terminus is at U.S. Route 52 three miles (5 km) east of Williamson.

Route description

WV 49 turns north and runs parallel to the Tug Fork and a Norfolk Southern rail line until terminating at US 52 near Williamson.

Major intersections

References

049
Transportation in Mingo County, West Virginia